The Society of Public Analysts was formed in the United Kingdom in 1874 and subsequently became the Society for Analytical Chemistry. It was incorporated in 1907.

The chemical industry had grown rapidly in the 19th century, and developments in the alkali, explosive and agricultural chemical fields produced a growing need for analytical chemists. Many of these chemists had little or no training in chemistry, and their lack of expertise was a danger to the public.  Shortly after the Adulteration of Food and Drink Act 1860 the Society was formed.  It established adulteration and food standards, and educated analysts in legal work.

It published The Analyst, Analytical Abstracts and the Proceedings of the Society for Analytical Chemistry (from 1964 to 1974).

In April 1966 it presented its first Gold Medal to Herbert Newton Wilson (author of An Approach To Chemical Analysis)* in recognition of his contribution to chemical analysis.*

On 15 May 1980, it amalgamated with the Chemical Society, the Royal Institute of Chemistry, and the Faraday Society to become the Royal Society of Chemistry.

Presidents 

 Theophilus Redwood: 1875–1876
 August Dupré: 1877–1878
 John Muter: 1879–1880
 Charles Heisch: 1881–1882
 George William Wigner: 1883–1884
 Dr Alfred Hill: 1885–1886
 Alfred Henry Allen: 1887–1888
 Matthew Adams: 1889–1890
 Otto Hehner: 1891–1892
 Sir Charles Alexander Cameron: 1893–1894
 Sir Thomas Stevenson: 1895–1896
 Bernard Dyer: 1897–1898
 Walter Fisher: 1899–1900
 Edward Voelcker: 1901–1902
 Thomas Fairley: 1903–1904
 Edward Bevan: 1905–1906
 John Clark: 1907
 Robert Rattray Tatlock: 1908–1909
 Edward Voelcker: 1910–1911
 Leonard Archbutt: 1912–1913
 Alfred Chapman: 1914–1915
 George Embrey: 1916–1917
 Samuel Rideal: 1918–1919
 Alfred Smetham: 1920–1921
 Percy Andrew Ellis Richards: 1922–1923
 George Rudd Thompson: 1924–1925
 Edward Richards Bolton: 1926–1927
 Edward Hinks: 1928–1929
 John Thomas Dunn: 1930–1931
 Francis William Frederick Annaud: 1932–1933
 John Evans: 1934–1935
 Gerald Roche Lynch: 1936–1937
 William Henry Roberts: 1938–1939
 Edwin Burnthorpe Hughes: 1940–1942
 Samuel Ernest Melling: 1943–1944
 Gordon Wickham Monier-Williams: 1945–1946
 Lewis Eynon: 1947–1948
 George Taylor: 1949–1950
 John Ralph Nicholls: 1951–1952
 Douglas William Kent-Jones: 1953–1954
 Kenneth Alan Williams: 1955–1956
 Jack Hubert Hamence: 1957–1958
 Ralph Clark Chirnside: 1959–1960
 Arthur James Amos: 1961–1962
 Donald Clarence Garrett: 1962–1963
 Albert Arthur Smales: 1964–1966
 Arthur George Jones: 1967–1968
 Thomas Summers West: 1969–1970
 Clifford Whalley: 1971–1972

References

History of Royal Society of Chemistry and the former societies
Society Information from Royal Society of Chemistry archives
Proceedings of the Society for Analytical Chemistry

History of chemistry
Royal Society of Chemistry
Defunct learned societies of the United Kingdom
1874 establishments in the United Kingdom
Scientific organizations established in 1874